Uepi is an island  located in the Western Province of the Solomon Islands (nation). It is noted for its high quality blue-water drop-off scuba diving.

Geography
Uepi is a classic raised barrier reef island, covered by rainforest, outlined by fringing reef and sandy beaches. The island is flanked by the warm lagoon waters on one side, and the oceanic depths (6000 ft/2000m) of "The Slot", a deep marine abyss, on the other. Uepi Island is approximately 2.5 km long and 300 metres wide. Uepi is only 90 minutes from Honiara by plane and boat.

References

Islands of the Solomon Islands
Western Province (Solomon Islands)